Shanrah Wakefield (born April 18, 1985) is an Australia born writer and actress.   Her writing credits include the Lifetime movie Wrong Swipe (2016), which she co-wrote with Sophie Tilson.  In acting, she was one of the stars of the 2009 web series, OzGirl, and joined the Australian sketch comedy series, Kinne in 2015.

Early life
Wakefield was born in Moe, a city in Victoria, Australia, where her parents, David and Toni Wakefield, owned Safetech Pty Ltd, a manufacturer of materials handling equipment.

She is a graduate of Monash University in Melbourne, where she earned degrees in Liberal Arts and Law. She also studied, for a time, at the Lee Strasburg Theater Institute in Los Angeles.

Career
In 2009, Wakefield starred in the Australia-based web series, OzGirl. The series won several awards including best actor at the 4th Annual ITVfest, which Wakefield shared with her co-star Sophie Tilson as well as the Streamy Award for best foreign web series.

In 2011, she co-starred in ElfQuest: A Fan Imagining a web trailer endorsed by the creators of the comic book series, ElfQuest.

In 2015, she joined the cast of the Australian sketch comedy show, Kinne, for its second season. 
 
In 2015, her screenplay for the movie, Wrong Swipe, which she wrote with her former OzGirl co-star, Sophie Tilson, was produced for Lifetime TV and aired on February 13, 2016.   She has had a number of subsequent TV movie writing credits.

Filmography

Awards and recognitions
ITVfest 
2009 Best actor for OzGirl
2009 Best web series for OzGirl
Streamy Awards Best foreign web series for OzGirl
Additional Recognitions
2009 WebSeriesToday Web star to watch award

References

External links

Australian television actresses
Australian screenwriters
Australian expatriate actresses in the United States
Australian web series actresses
1985 births
Living people
People from Moe, Victoria